The Canarian United People (PCU) was a left-wing nationalist political coalition operating in the Canary Islands. The party aim was self-determination for the islands and socialism. It was a coalition between various political parties and groups, with a communist, pro-independence or nationalist ideology. The coalition received the support of the MPAIAC.

Members of the coalition
The political parties that formed the Coalition were:

 Communist Party of the Canary Islands (provisional) (PCC(p)), later called Party of the Canarian Revolution. 
 Células Comunistas (CC)

History
In the Spanish elections of 1977 PCU only presented a candidacy to the Province of Las Palmas, obtaining 17,717 votes (the third most voted list), but no representation.

In 1979 PCU was banned from participating in the general elections because it was considered and "anti-constitutional" candidacy. This led the organizations that formed the coalition to create a new movement: Canarian People's Union (UPC). UPC was joined by the Party of Communist Unification in the Canaries (PUCC), Socialist Party of the Canaries, Canarian Assembly and 
Canarian Nationalist Autonomous Confederation. A sector of PCU that was critical with the political direction of the coalition, which they considered that was moderating towards autonomist positions, left the PCC(p) and CC and formed a movement called Radicales de Base de PCU, that finally also joined UPC.

Election results

Congress of Deputies

See also
 Canarian nationalism

References

Defunct political party alliances in Spain
Political parties in the Canary Islands
Defunct socialist parties in Spain
Defunct nationalist parties in Spain
Political parties established in 1977
1977 establishments in Spain
Canarian nationalist parties
Left-wing nationalist parties